Janko Tipsarević was the defending champion but chose not to defend his title.

Prajnesh Gunneswaran won the title after defeating Mohamed Safwat 5–7, 6–3, 6–1 in the final.

Seeds

Draw

Finals

Top half

Bottom half

References
Main Draw
Qualifying Draw

Kunming Open - Men's Singles
2018 Men's Singles